Mattan is a town, tehsil and a notified area committee, near Anantnag city in the Anantnag district of the Indian union territory of Jammu and Kashmir.

Demographics
As of 2011 India census, Mattan had a population of 9,246. Males constitute 55.2% of the population and females 44.8%. Mattan has an average literacy rate of 73%, higher than the state average of 67.16%: male literacy is around 82.77%, and female literacy is 61.38%.

Population of Children with age of 0-6 is 1353 which is 14.63% of total population of Mattan (MC). In Mattan Municipal Committee, Female Sex Ratio is of 813 against state average of 889. Moreover, Child Sex Ratio in Mattan is around 958 compared to Jammu and Kashmir state average of 862.

See also
 Martand Sun Temple

References

Cities and towns in Anantnag district